Richard James Bright (June 28, 1937 – February 18, 2006) was an American actor, well known for his role as Al Neri in the Godfather films.

Early life
Bright was born in Bay Ridge, Brooklyn, New York City, the son of Matilda (née Scott) and Ernest Bright, who was a shipbuilder.

Career
Bright began his career doing live television in Manhattan at the age of 18, and made his film debut in Robert Wise's Odds Against Tomorrow (1959). He also worked on several movies early in his career with his friend Sam Peckinpah.

In 1965, Bright starred in poet Michael McClure's two-person show The Beard, performing first in San Francisco and later in Los Angeles, New York City, and London. In San Francisco,  his female co-star Billie Dixon and he were arrested and brutally beaten by police for uttering obscenities about local politicians and simulating them in sexual acts. The ACLU represented Bright, citing First Amendment rights to freedom of speech. In the end, the charges against him were dismissed; the case was considered important for free speech in general and actors' rights in particular.

He had a supporting role in The Getaway (1972) as a con man who tries to ply his trade on Carol McCoy (Ali MacGraw), and co-starred in The Panic in Needle Park (1971), playing Hank, brother of Al Pacino's character.

In 1972, he appeared in Francis Ford Coppola's adaptation of The Godfather as Al Neri, Michael Corleone (Al Pacino)'s primary enforcer and bodyguard. Michael, as the don of the Corleone family, implements a security detail that keeps Neri and Rocco Lampone (Tom Rosqui) close by at all times. A deleted scene from The Godfather shows former consigliere and family attorney Tom Hagen reviewing the payroll ledgers, discovering that both Neri and Lampone are being paid much more than their nominal jobs are worth. Both are soon revealed, in fact, as assassins Michael has doubling as bodyguards.

In the book, Neri's character is a former New York City police officer who is hung out to dry by the department after killing a sadistic pimp. Michael uses Corleone family influence to get him off the hook and draws Neri into his service. At the end of the first film, Neri, dressed as a police officer, murders rival mob boss Emilio Barzini and his henchmen during the film's baptism scene. Also, the last faces to be seen in The Godfather are Bright and Diane Keaton's, as he closes Michael's office door in her face. Bright also played Neri in both sequels, thus becoming one of five actors to appear in all three Godfather films; his character murders Fredo Corleone (John Cazale) at the end of The Godfather Part II and the Vatican banker Archbishop Gilday at the end of The Godfather Part III.

Bright played another hired killer, Chicken Joe, in Sergio Leone's gangster epic Once Upon a Time in America (1984). His other roles include Pat Garrett and Billy the Kid (1973), Rancho Deluxe (1975), Marathon Man (1976), Looking for Mr. Goodbar (1977), the film adaptation of Hair (1979), Red Heat (1988), and Beautiful Girls (1996).

In 1993, he had a recurring role on One Life to Live as "Moose" Mulligan, rival and former underboss to longtime arch-villain and crime lord Carlo Hesser. In 1996, he appeared in the interactive movie Ripper.

Bright continued to make a number of both commercial and independent films, such as Jaded (1998). He also continued working on stage and in television, appearing on such shows as Law & Order, Oz, Third Watch, and The Sopranos. These later performances showed Bright using an oxygen tank in all these appearances (although he suffered from emphysema, the tanks were props for the characters).

Death
Bright was struck and killed by the driver of a tour bus on the Upper West Side in Manhattan on February 18, 2006. He was hit by the rear wheel of the bus, and pronounced dead on arrival at Roosevelt Hospital. The driver claimed to have been unaware of the collision until he was notified upon reaching the Port Authority in midtown Manhattan, where he was interviewed by police. Ultimately, no criminal charges were filed, though the bus driver's license was suspended for failing to yield the right of way  to Bright, who had been in a marked crosswalk with the walk sign on at the time he was struck. Bright was 68 years old at that time. He was survived by his wife Rutanya Alda, son Jeremy, daughter Diane, and brother Charles.

Selected filmography

 1958 Never Love a Stranger as Street Gang Tough Lookout (uncredited)
 1959 Odds Against Tomorrow as 'Coco'
 1969 Lions Love as THE BEARD: Billy The Kid
 1971 The Panic in Needle Park as Hank
 1972 The Godfather as Al Neri
 1972 The Getaway as The Thief
 1973 Pat Garrett and Billy the Kid as Holly
 1973 Black Harvest
 1974 The Sugarland Express as Marvin Dybala (uncredited)
 1974 Bring Me the Head of Alfredo Garcia as Bar Patron (uncredited)
 1974 The Godfather Part II as Al Neri
 1975 Rancho Deluxe as Burt
 1976 Marathon Man as Karl
 1977 Handle with Care as Jack 'Smilin' Jack'
 1977 Looking for Mr. Goodbar as George
 1978 On the Yard as Nunn
 1979 Hair as Fenton
 1980 The Idolmaker as Uncle Tony
 1982 Girls Nite Out as Detective Greenspan
 1983 Vigilante as Burke
 1983 Two of a Kind as Stuart
 1984 Once Upon a Time in America as Joe 'Chicken Joe'
 1985 Crimewave as Officer Brennan
 1985 Cut and Run as Bob Allo
 1986 Penalty Phase as Judge Von Karman
 1986 Brighton Beach Memoirs as Recruiting Sergeant
 1987 The Verne Miller Story as Adam Richetti
 1988 Time Out as The Sheriff 
 1988 Red Heat as Sgt. Gallagher
 1990 The Ambulance as McClosky
 1990 The Godfather Part III as Al Neri
 1993 Who's the Man? as Demetrius
 1994 The Ref as Murray
 1994 Who Do I Gotta Kill? as Belcher
 1995 Pictures of Baby Jane Doe as Rudy
 1995 Blue Funk as Father
 1995 Sweet Nothing as Jack, The Cop
 1996 Beautiful Girls as Dick Conway
 1996 Night Falls on Manhattan as 64 Precinct Lieutenant
 1997 The Hotel Manor Inn
 1998 OK Garage as Louis
 1998 Jaded as Zack Brown
 1998 Anima as Tommy
 1999 Joe the King as Roy
 1999 Getting to Know You as Elderly Man
 2000 The Photographer as Drunk In Bar
 2000 Broke Even as Lazarus
 2001 Trigger Happy as Quigley
 2001 Dead Dog as Cunningham
 2006 Day on Fire - (final film role)

References

External links

1937 births
2006 deaths
American male film actors
American male television actors
Pedestrian road incident deaths
Male actors from New York City
Road incident deaths in New York City
American male stage actors
People from Bay Ridge, Brooklyn
20th-century American male actors